Jimmy Tolmie (20 November 1895 – 9 March 1955) was a Scotland international rugby union player.

Rugby Union career

Amateur career

Tolmie went to the High School of Glasgow from 1907 to 1912.

He played rugby union for Glasgow HSFP from 1913 onwards.

He was noted as a resolute player, showing 'determination to go for the line at whatever cost to himself, his opponents, the corner flag, or the spectators'.

Provincial career

He played for Glasgow District in the 1919 inter-city match.

International career

He received one cap for Scotland, in 1922.

His solitary cap came after his clubmate, and rival for the Scotland place, Arthur Browning was injured in a match against Heriots.

Military career

He enlisted soon after the First World War began. He was mentioned twice in despatches.

Family

His father was Murdo Tolmie from Dingwall in Ross-shire, and his mother Elizabeth Masterton (c.1860–1945). He married Isobel Hunter Scott.

Death

He died on 9 March 1955 and is buried in Biggar churchyard in South Lanarkshire.

References

1895 births
1955 deaths
Scottish rugby union players
Glasgow District (rugby union) players
Scotland international rugby union players
Glasgow HSFP players
Rugby union wings